The 2014 Christy Ring Cup was the tenth staging of the Christy Ring Cup hurling championship since its establishment by the Gaelic Athletic Association in 2005. The cup competition began on 3 May 2014 and ended on 7 June 2014.

Down were the defending champions; however, they lost their opening two games and avoided relegation by defeating Armagh in a play-off, before being awarded the final promotion/relegation playoff when Tyrone withdrew.

Teams
A total of eight teams contested the championship.

Team summaries

Fixtures/results

Round 1

Round 2A

Round 2B

Quarter-finals

Relegation play-off

Semi-finals

Final

Promotion play-off

Championship statistics

Scoring
 First goal of the championship: Shane Nolan for Kerry against Derry (3 May 2014)
Widest winning margin: 32 points
 Kerry 4-31 - 0-11 Derry (3 May 2014)
Most goals in a match: 7
 Down 5-24 - 2-15 Armagh (31 May 2014)
Most points in a match: 51
 Kildare 1-27 - 2-24 Wicklow (3 May 2014)
Most goals by one team in a match: 5
 Down 5-24 - 2-15 Armagh (31 May 2014)
 Highest aggregate score: 60
 Kildare 1-27 - 2-24 Wicklow (3 May 2014)
 Down 5-24 - 2-15 Armagh (31 May 2014)
Lowest aggregate score: 28
 Meath 0-17 - 1-8 Down (3 May 2014)
Most goals scored by a losing team: 3
 Wicklow 3-13 - 1-20 Kildare (10 May 2014)
 Armagh 3-13 - 3-19 Wicklow (17 May 2014)

Scoring statistics

Championship

Single game

Clean sheets

External links
 GAA fixtures 2014

References

Christy Ring Cup
Christy Ring Cup